Martha de San Bernardo, P.C.C., was a 17th-century Colettine Poor Clare who was first Filipino woman to become a Roman Catholic nun; she  served on Macao. The cause for her canonization has been submitted.

Biography
While her birth name is lost, it is recorded that she was a ladina (a Spanish-speaking native of the Philippines who had no Spanish ancestry) who belonged to an affluent and influential family from Pampanga on the island of Luzon, then part of the Spanish East Indies. Inspired by the lives of the Colettine Clares who had arrived from Spain in 1621 under the leadership of Mother Jerónima de la Asunción, P.C.C., and established the Royal Monastery of Santa Clara in Intramuros, she wished to become a nun herself. In this, she was able to secure the support of the monastic community. Due, however, to the colonial regulations of the Spanish Empire which ruled the islands and the existing racial prejudices of the period, she was barred from admission.

Instead, in 1633, with the assistance of the Minister General of the Franciscans, she was sent to a newly opened monastery in the Portuguese colony of Macau. Together with several Spanish postulants, she was formally received into the Colettine Order on board a ship sailing the South China Sea, at which time she was given the religious name by which she is now known.

The precise details of Mother De San Bernardo's death are unrecorded. The Colettines officially give the years 1639-40, saying that she died in Macau while on mission.

Veneration
The cause for Martha de San Bernardo's canonization has been put forward, but it is still awaiting approval by the Congregation for the Causes of Saints of the Holy See.

See also
San Lorenzo Ruiz, the first Filipino to be canonised
San Pedro Calungsod, the second Filipino to be canonised
Ignacia del Espiritu Santo
Religious of the Virgin Mary

References

External links

People from Pampanga
17th-century Filipino Roman Catholic nuns
Colettine Poor Clares
Year of death unknown
Year of birth unknown